Impatiens obesa is a species of plant in the family Balsaminaceae. It is endemic to China.

References

obesa
Endemic flora of China
Endangered plants
Taxonomy articles created by Polbot